John Elliott (October 24, 1773 – August 9, 1827) was a United States senator from Georgia, serving from 1819 to 1825.

Elliott graduated from Yale University in 1794 and returned to Georgia to practice law. He was elected to the Senate after holding several local offices.

Through his first wife Esther Dunwoody, he was the father of Hester Amarintha "Hettie" Elliott (1797–1831) and Corinne Elliott. Hettie was the first wife of Major James Stephens Bulloch (1793–1849) and mother of Civil War Confederate veteran James Dunwoody Bulloch (1823–1901).

Senator Elliott was also the first husband of Martha  "Patsy" Stewart (1799—1864), daughter of General Daniel Stewart and Sarah Susannah Oswald. John and Patsy had four children:

Susan Ann Elliott (1820–1895)
Georgia Amanda Elliott (1822–1848)
Charles William Elliott (September 1824 – c. 1825)
Daniel Stewart "Dan" Elliott (1826–1861), Civil War Confederate casualty

After his death, Patsy married his son-in-law Major Bulloch on May 8, 1832, and had four children, including Martha "Mittie" Bulloch (1835–1884) and Civil War Confederate veteran Irvine Stephens Bulloch (1842–1898). Mittie was the mother of US President Theodore Roosevelt (1858–1919) and Elliott Roosevelt (1860–1894), who was the father of First Lady Anna Eleanor Roosevelt (1884–1962).

In 1820, he owned 115 slaves in Liberty County, Georgia. In 1830, his estate owned 117 slaves.

References

External links
 Congressional biography
 

1773 births
1827 deaths
United States senators from Georgia (U.S. state)
Yale University alumni
Democratic-Republican Party United States senators
Georgia (U.S. state) Democratic-Republicans
American slave owners
People from Liberty County, Georgia

United States senators who owned slaves